Grey hornbill may refer to one of several distinct species of hornbills:
 African grey hornbill, Tockus nasutus
 Malabar grey hornbill, Ocyceros griseus
 Indian grey hornbill, Ocyceros birostris
 Sri Lanka grey hornbill, Ocyceros gingalensis

Animal common name disambiguation pages